The Qatar Philharmonic Orchestra (QPO), a member of Qatar Foundation for Education, Science and Community Development, was founded in 2007 by Sheikha Mozah bint Nasser Al Missned, the then Emir of Qatar's consort. The orchestra performs both Western and Middle Eastern works, encouraging the enjoyment and creation of such music by the people of Qatar and the region.

History 
Kurt Meister, the former managing director of the Bavarian Radio Symphony Orchestra, was invited by Sheikha Mozah to create an orchestra of international standard and recruited players from over 30 countries. In 2008, Egyptian conductor Nader Abbassi was appointed musical director and Lebanese musician Marcel Khalife became the artistic director and composer-in-residence.

The QPO's inaugural concert was held in Doha on 30 October 2008, conducted by Lorin Maazel. The 101-player orchestra's home is now the Opera House at the Katara Cultural Village. In advancing its role in the promotion of Middle East composers, the orchestra now has nearly forty such works in its repertoire. In addition to its Qatar season, the orchestra has also toured internationally, in the Middle East (Syria), Europe (UK, France, Austria, Italy, Russia), Asia (China) and the United States (New York and Washington).

On 8 September 2014, during a European tour, the orchestra's musical director Han-na Chang resigned, citing "persistent administrative difficulties and irreconcilable artistic differences".

Artistic and musical directors 
 Marcel Khalife, artistic director 2008–2010
 Nader Abbassi, musical director 2008–2011
 Michalis Economou, musical director 2011–2013
 Han-na Chang, musical director 2013–2014

Guest conductors
List of guest conductors who have conducted the Qatar Philharmonic Orchestra:
Lorin Maazel
Dmitri Kitayenko
Gianluigi Gelmetti
Andreas Weiser
Marc Minkowski
James Gaffigan
David Afkham
Philippe Auguin
Bob Ross
Pablo Mielgo
Alastair Willis
James Shearman

See also 
 Music of Qatar

References

External links 
 QPO website
 Qatar Foundation website

2007 establishments in Qatar
Qatari orchestras
Musical groups established in 2007